Lars Jonsson (born 1952 in Stockholm) is a Swedish ornithological illustrator living in Hamra in the south part of the Swedish island of Gotland. He was appointed an honorary degree by Uppsala University in 2002.

Bibliography

English/Translated Works
Birds of Sea and Coast (1978) Penguin 
Birds of Wood, Park and Garden (1978) Penguin  - also translated in Dutch and German
Birds of Lake, River, Marsh and Field(1978) Penguin 
Birds of Mountain Regions (1979) Penguin 
The Island: Bird Life on a Shoal of Sand, Christopher Helm 
Birds of the Mediterranean and Alps Croom Helm Ltd 
Birds of Europe: With North Africa and the Middle East Translated by David Christie (1992)  - also translated in Danish, Dutch, French, and German
 1999 edition Helm (1999) 
Birds and Light: The Art of Lars Jonsson Helm (2002) 
Where Heaven and Earth Touch: The Art of the Birdpainter Lars Jonsson Dr. M. Imhof (2008) 
Lars Jonsson's Birds, winner National Outdoor Book Award (Design and Artistic Merit), Princeton University Press (2008)

Articles
The Image of a Bird, Birds, Spring 1993, Vol 14 No 5, pages 54–58

Swedish
Fåglar i naturen. 5, Medelhavsländerna och Alperna Wahlström & Widstrand (1980) 
Lommar : art- och åldersbestämning samt ruggning hos smålom Gavia stellata, storlom Gavia arctica, islom Gavia immer och vitnäbbad islom Gavia adamsii Sveriges Ornitologiska Förening (1992) 
En Dag i Maj Atlantis 
Lars Jonsson : fåglar och ljus Atlantis (2002) 
Lars Jonssons Fåglar i Europa med Nordafrika och Mellanöstern Wahlström & Widstrand (2006)

References

External links
COPAC bibliography
Lars Jonsson's Homepage in Swedish and English.

20th-century Swedish painters
Swedish male painters
21st-century Swedish painters
Swedish bird artists
Living people
1952 births
20th-century Swedish male artists
21st-century Swedish male artists